L. C. Goyal is a member of the Indian Administrative Service (IAS) belonging to 1979 batch, Kerala cadre and presently Chairman and Managing Director (CMD) of India Trade Promotion Organization,a miniratna Public sector undertaking (PSU).

Goyal was born on May 10, 1955 in the state of Haryana. He is a Bachelor of Commerce & Law from Delhi University, India.

In his long career, Goyal has held many key senior management positions both at the Center as well in the Government of Kerala. Some of them being Union Home Secretary, Ministry of Home Affairs, Govt. of India; Secretary Rural Development, Ministry of Rural Development, Govt. of India (where he implemented flagship programs like MGNREGA, PMGSY, IAY & NRLM); Special Secretary, Cabinet Secretariat, Govt. of India; Principal Secretary Finance, Govt. of Kerala, Additional Secretary & Director General (CGHS), Ministry of Health & Family Welfare, Govt. of India; Joint Secretary, Ministry of Home Affairs, Govt. of India; Collector & District Magistrate Kozhikode, Govt. of Kerala; Deputy Secretary, Ministry of Corporate Affairs, Govt. of India. He retired from service on 31 August 2015.

References

Living people
1955 births
Indian civil servants
Indian Home Secretaries